The 1124 papal election (held 16–21 December) took place after the death of Pope Callixtus II on 13 December 1124 and chose Pope Honorius II as his successor.

Background
Pressures building within the Curia, together with ongoing conflicts among the Roman nobility, would erupt after the death of Pope Callixtus II in 1124. The pontificates of Urban II and Paschal II had seen an expansion in the College of Cardinals of Italian clerics that strengthened the local Roman influence. These cardinals were reluctant to meet with the group of cardinals recently promoted by Callixtus II, who were mainly French or Burgundian. As far as the older cardinals were concerned, these newer cardinals were dangerous innovators, and they were determined to resist their increasing influence. The northern cardinals, led by Cardinal Aymeric de Bourgogne (the Papal Chancellor), were equally determined to ensure that the elected pope would be one of their candidates. Both groups looked towards the great Roman families for support.

By 1124, there were two great factions dominating local politics in Rome: the Frangipani family, which controlled the region around the fortified Colosseum and supported the northern cardinals, and the Pierleoni family, which controlled the Tiber Island and the fortress of the Theatre of Marcellus and supported the Italian cardinals.  With Callixtus II's death on 13 December 1124, both families agreed that the election of the next pope should be in three days time, in accordance with the church canons. The Frangipani, led by Leo Frangipani, pushed for a delay in order that they could promote their preferred candidate, Lamberto, but the people were eager to see Saxo de Anagni, the Cardinal-Priest of San Stefano in Celiomonte elected as the next pope. Leo, eager to ensure a valid election, approached key members of every Cardinal's entourage, promising each one that he would support their master when the voting for the election was underway.

Election
On 16 December, the Cardinals, including Lamberto, assembled in the chapel of the monastery of St. Pancratius attached to the south of the Lateran basilica. There, at the suggestion of Jonathas, the cardinal-deacon of Santi Cosma e Damiano, who was a partisan of the Pierleoni family, the Cardinals unanimously elected as Pope the cardinal-priest of Sant’ Anastasia, Theobaldo Boccapecci, who took the name Celestine II. He had only just put on the red mantle and the Te Deum was being sung when an armed party led by Roberto Frangipani (in a move pre-arranged with Cardinal Aymeric) burst in, attacked the newly enthroned Celestine, who was wounded, and acclaimed Lamberto as Pope. Since Celestine had not been formally consecrated pope, the wounded candidate declared himself willing to resign, but the Pierleoni family and their supporters refused to accept Lamberto, who in the confusion had been proclaimed Pope under the name Honorius II. Historians call the election "a travesty of canonical procedure".

Rome descended into factional infighting, while Cardinal Aymeric and Leo Frangipani attempted to win over the resistance of Urban, the City Prefect, and the Pierleoni family with bribes and extravagant promises. Eventually, Celestine's supporters abandoned him, leaving Honorius the only contender for the papal throne. Honorius, unwilling to accept the throne in such a manner, resigned his position before the assembled Cardinals, but was immediately and unanimously re-elected and consecrated on 21 December 1124.

Cardinals 

The College of Cardinals probably had between 47 and 53 members. Little information is available on which Cardinals were actually present in Rome during the election(s).

The following table lists the Cardinals who were alive at the time of the election.

Absentee Cardinals

References

Works cited

 Levillain, Philippe (2002) The Papacy: An Encyclopedia, Vol II: Gaius-Proxies, Routledge
 Mann, Horace K. (1925) The Lives of the Popes in the Middle Ages, Vol 8
 Thomas, P. C. (2007) A Compact History of the Popes, St Pauls BYB

Notes

12th-century elections
1124
1124
12th-century Catholicism
1124 in Europe